Yiğit Arslan (born 12 May 1996) is a Turkish professional basketball player for Bahçeşehir Koleji of the Turkish Basketball Super League (BSL) and the Turkish national team.

Professional career

Tofaş (2014–2019) 
Arslan started his professional career at Tofaş in 2014 at the age of 18, in the 2014–15 season, he averaged 2.6 point, 1.4 rebound and 0.5 assist. In the 2015–16 season, he averaged 6.1 point, 1.8 rebound and 1.1 assists. In the 2016–17 season, he averaged 3.5 point, 1.5 rebound and 0.8 assists. In the 2017–18 season, he averaged 4.8 point, 1.6 rebound and 1 assists In the 2017–18 season at Tofaş, he averaged 6.7 point, 2.7 rebound and 1.7 assists.

Galatasaray (2019–2021) 
Before the 2019–20 season, he moved to the Galatasaray S.K. team.

Tofaş (2021–2022) 
On July 1, 2021, he has signed with Tofaş and returned back where his professional career has started.

Bahçeşehir Koleji (2022–present) 
On June 21, 2022, he has signed with Bahçeşehir Koleji of the Turkish Basketball Super League (BSL).

National team career

Junior teams
Arslan represented Turkey at the 2014 FIBA U18 European Championship in Konya, Turkey, where he averaged 4.4 points, 2.7 rebounds and 0.3 assists.
A year later, he played at the 2015 FIBA Under-19 World Cup, where he averaged 5.6 points, 2.4 rebounds and 0.6 assists. He also represented the Turkish national under-20 team at the 2016 FIBA U20 European Championship in Finland, where he averaged 9.4 points, 4.3 rebounds and 2 assists.

Senior team
Arslan represented the Turkish national team at the 2019 FIBA World Cup in China, where he averaged 0.7 points, 1 rebound and 0.3 assists.

References

External links
 RealGM profile

1996 births
Living people
2019 FIBA Basketball World Cup players
Bahçeşehir Koleji S.K. players
Galatasaray S.K. (men's basketball) players
People from Osmangazi
Shooting guards
Sportspeople from Bursa
Tofaş S.K. players
Turkish men's basketball players